The 2023 CAFA  Championship will be the 1st edition of the CAFA Championship, the biennial international men's football championship of Central Asia organized by Central Asian Football Association (CAFA). The event will be held in Uzbekistan from 9 June – 21 June.

Participating nations

Squads
For the list of squads, see 2023 CAFA Championship squads.

Venue

Officials

Group stage
The precise format and schedule of the CAFA Championship are yet to be approved. However, the currently proposed format is the group-knockout format for the tournament.

Table

Tiebreakers
Teams were ranked according to points (3 points for a win, 1 point for a draw, 0 points for a loss), and if tied on points, the following tie-breaking criteria were applied, in the order given, to determine the rankings.
Points in head-to-head matches among tied teams;
Goal difference in head-to-head matches among tied teams;
Goals scored in head-to-head matches among tied teams;
If more than two teams are tied, and after applying all head-to-head criteria above, a subset of teams are still tied, all head-to-head criteria above are reapplied exclusively to this subset of teams;
Goal difference in all group matches;
Goals scored in all group matches;
Penalty shoot-out if only two teams were tied and they met in the last round of the group;
Disciplinary points (yellow card = 1 point, red card as a result of two yellow cards = 3 points, direct red card = 3 points, yellow card followed by direct red card = 4 points);
Drawing of lots.

Group A

Group B

Knockout Round

3rd Place

Final

See also 
 2023 SAFF Championship
 2022 AFF Championship
 2022 EAFF E-1 Football Championship
 2023 WAFF Championship
 2023 AFC Asian Cup

References

CAFA Championship
2023 in Asian football